was the 59th emperor of Japan, according to the traditional order of succession.

Uda's reign spanned the years from 887 through 897.

Traditional narrative

Name  and legacy

Emperor Uda was the third son of Emperor Kōkō.  His mother was Empress Dowager Hanshi, a daughter of Prince Nakano (who was himself a son of Emperor Kanmu). Uda had five Imperial consorts and 20 Imperial children.  Particularly important sons include:

 Prince Atsuhito (884–930).
 Prince Atsuzane (敦実親王) (893–967).

Historical background

In ancient Japan, there were four noble clans, the Gempeitōkitsu (源平藤橘). One of these clans, the Minamoto clan (源氏), is  also known as Genji.  Some of Uda's grandchildren were granted the surname Minamoto (Minamoto is the most used surname for former Japanese royalty.). In order to distinguish Uda's descendants from other Minamoto clan families (源氏) or Genji, they became known as the Uda Genji (宇多源氏). Some of the Uda Genji moved to Ōmi Province and known as Sasaki clan (佐々木氏) or Ōmi Genji (近江源氏).

Among the Uda Genji, Minamoto no Masazane (源雅信), a son of Prince Atsumi (敦実親王) succeeded in the court. Masazane became sadaijin (Minister of the Left).  One of Masazane's daughters, Minamoto no Rinshi (源倫子) married Fujiwara no Michinaga and from this marriage three empresses dowagers and two regents (sesshō) were born.

From Masanobu, several kuge families originated including the Niwata, Ayanokōji, Itsutsuji, Ōhara and Jikōji. From his fourth son Sukeyosi, the Sasaki clan originated, and thus Kyōgoku clan originated. These descendants are known as Ōmi Genji today. From this line, Sasaki Takauji made a success at the Muromachi shogunate and the Amago clan originated from his brother.

Events of Uda's life
Uda's father, Emperor Kōkō, demoted his sons from the rank of imperial royals to that of subjects in order to reduce the state expenses, as well as their political influence. Sadami was given the clan name of Minamoto and named Minamoto no Sadami. Later, in 887, when  Kōkō needed to appoint his successor, Sadami was once again promoted to the Imperial Prince rank with support of kampaku Fujiwara no Mototsune, since Sadami was adopted by a half-sister of Mototsune.  After the death of his father in November of that year, Sadami-shinnō ascended to the throne.

 September 17, 887 (Ninna 3, 26th day of the 8th month):  Emperor Kōkō died; and his third son received the succession (senso).  Shortly thereafter, Emperor Uda formally acceded to the throne (sokui).
 December 5, 887 (Ninna 3, 17th day of the 11th month): Mototsune asked Uda for permission to retire from his duties; but the emperor is said to have responded, "My youth limits my ability to govern; and if you stop offering me your good counsel, I will be obliged to abdicate and to retire to a monastery."  Therefore, Mototsune continued to serve as the new emperor's kampaku.

 889 (Kanpyō 1, 10th month):  The former emperor Yōzei became deranged, and afflicted by mental illness. Yōzei would enter the palace and address courtiers he would meet with the greatest rudeness. He became increasingly furious.  He garroted women with the strings of musical instruments and then threw the bodies into a lake.  While riding on horseback, he directed his mount to run over people.  Sometimes he simply disappeared into the mountains where he chased wild boars and red deer.

In the beginning of Uda's reign, Mototsune held the office of kampaku (or chancellor). Emperor Uda's reign is marked by a prolonged struggle to reassert power by the Imperial Family away from the increasing influence of the Fujiwara, beginning with the death of Mototsune in 891.  Records show that shortly thereafter, Emperor Uda assigned scholars Sukeyo and Kiyoyuki, supporters of Mototsune, to provincial posts in the remote provinces of Mutsu and Higo respectively.  Meanwhile, non-Fujiwara officials mainly from the Minamoto family were promoted to prominent ranks, while his trusted counselor, Sugawara no Michizane rapidly rose in rank within five years to reach the third rank in the court, and supervision of the Crown Prince's household.  Meanwhile, Mototsune's son and heir, Fujiwara no Tokihira, rose in rank, but only just enough to prevent an open power struggle.

Meanwhile, Emperor Uda attempted to return Court politics to the original spirit envisioned in the Ritsuryō Codes, while reviving intellectual interest in Confucian doctrine and culture.  In the seventh month of 896, Emperor Uda dispatched Sugawara no Michizane to review prisoners in the capitol and provide a general amnesty for the wrongfully accused, in keeping with Chinese practices.  Emperor Uda also issued edicts reinforcing peasant land rights from encroachment by powerful families in the capital or monastic institutions, while auditing tax collections made in the provinces.

Emperor Uda stopped the practice of sending ambassadors to China ("ken-toh-shi" 遣唐使).  The emperor's decision was informed by what he understood as persuasive counsel from Sugawara Michizane.

The Special Festival of the Kamo Shrine was first held during Uda's reign.

In 897, Uda abdicated in favor of his eldest son, Prince Atsuhito, who would later come to be known as Emperor Daigo.  Uda left behind an hortatory will or testament which offered general admonitions or precepts  for his son's guidance (see excerpt at right).  The document praises Fujiwara no Tokihira as an advisor but cautions against his womanizing; and Sugawara no Michizane is praised as Uda's mentor.  Both were assigned by Emperor Uda to look after his son until the latter reach maturity.

Three years later, he entered the Buddhist priesthood at age 34 in 900.  Having founded the temple at Ninna-ji, Uda made it his new home after his abdication.

  His Buddhist name was Kongō Kaku.  He was sometimes called "the Cloistered Emperor of Teiji(亭子の帝)," because the name of the Buddhist hall where he resided after becoming a priest was called Teijiin.

Uda died in 931 (Shōhei 1, 19th day of the 7th month) at the age of 65.

The actual site of Uda's grave is known.  This emperor is traditionally venerated at a memorial Shinto shrine (misasagi) at Kyoto.

The Imperial Household Agency designates this location as Uda's mausoleum.  It is formally named Kaguragaoka no Higashi no misasagi.

The former emperor is buried amongst the "Seven Imperial Tombs" at Ryōan-ji Temple in Kyoto. The mound which commemorates the Hosokawa Emperor Uda is today named O-uchiyama.  The emperor's burial place would have been quite humble in the period after Uda died.  These tombs reached their present state as a result of the 19th century restoration of imperial sepulchers which were ordered by Emperor Meiji.

Kugyō
 is a collective term for the very few most powerful men attached to the court of the Emperor of Japan in pre-Meiji eras.

In general, this elite group included only three to four men at a time.  These were hereditary courtiers whose experience and background would have brought them to the pinnacle of a life's career.

During Uda's reign, this apex of the Daijō-kan included:

 Kampaku, Fujiwara no Mototsune　 (藤原基経), 836–891.
 Daijō-daijin, Fujiwara no Mototsune.
 Sadaijin, Minamoto no Tōru　 (源融).
 Sadaijin, Fujiwara no Yoshiyo　 (藤原良世).
 Udaijin, Minamoto no Masaru   (源多).
 Udaijin, Fujiwara no Yoshiyo 　(藤原良世).
 Udaijin, Minamoto no Yoshiari　 (源能有).
 Naidaijin (not appointed)
 Dainagon

Eras of Uda's reign
The years of Uda's reign are more specifically identified by more than one era name, or nengō.
 Ninna       (885–889)
 Kanpyō      (889–898)

Consorts and children
Consort (Nyōgo): Fujiwara no Onshi (藤原温子; 872–907), Fujiwara no Mototsune’s daughter
Imperial Princess Kinshi (均子内親王; 890–910), married to Imperial Prince Atsuyoshi

Consort (Nyōgo): Fujiwara no Inshi (藤原胤子; d.896), Fujiwara no Takafuji’s daughter
First Son: Imperial Prince Atsugimi (敦仁親王; 885–930) later Emperor Daigo
Fourth Son: Imperial Prince Atsuyoshi (敦慶親王; 887–930)
Imperial Prince Atsukata (敦固親王; d.926)
Imperial Princess Jūshi (柔子内親王; 892–958), 25th Saiō in Ise Shrine (897–930)
Eighth Son: Imperial Prince Atsumi (敦実親王; 893–967)

Consort (Nyōgo): Tachibana no Yoshiko/Gishi (橘義子), Tachibana no Hiromi’s daughter
Second Son: Imperial Prince Tokinaka (斉中親王; 885–891)
Third Son: Imperial Prince Tokiyo (斉世親王; 886–927) later Imperial Prince Priest Shinjaku (真寂法親王)
Imperial Prince Tokikuni (斉邦親王)
Fourth Daughter: Imperial Princess Kunshi (君子内親王; d.902), 10th Saiin in Kamo Shrine (893–902)

Consort (Nyōgo): Sugawara no Hiroko/Enshi (菅原衍子), Sugawara no Michizane’s daughter
 Minamoto no Junshi (源順子; 875-925) married Fujiwara no Tadahira

Consort (Nyōgo): Tachibana no Fusako (橘房子; d.893)

Court Attendant (Koui): Minamoto no Sadako (源貞子), Minamoto no Noboru’s daughter
Imperial Princess Ishi (依子内親王; 895–936)

Court Attendant (Koui): Princess Norihime (徳姫女王), Prince Tōyo’s daughter
Imperial Princess Fushi (孚子内親王; d.958)

Court Attendant (Koui): Fujiwara no Yasuko (藤原保子), Fujiwara no Arizane’s daughter
Imperial Princess Kaishi (誨子内親王; 894–952), married to Imperial Prince Motoyoshi (son of Emperor Yōzei)
Imperial Princess Kishi (季子内親王; d.979)

Court Attendant (Koui): Minamoto no Hisako (源久子)

Court Attendant (Koui): Fujiwara no Shizuko (藤原静子)

Lady-in-waiting: Fujiwara no Hōshi (藤原褒子), Fujiwara no Tokihira’s daughter
Imperial Prince Masaakira (雅明親王; 920–929)
Imperial Prince Noriakira (載明親王)
Imperial Prince Yukiakira (行明親王; 926–948)

Court lady: A daughter of Fujiwara no Tsugukage, Ise (伊勢; 875/7–ca. 939)
prince (died young)

(from unknown women)
Imperial Prince Yukinaka (行中親王; d.909)
Imperial Princess Seishi (成子内親王; d.979)
Minamoto no Shinshi (源臣子)

Ancestry

Notes

References
 Brown, Delmer M. and Ichirō Ishida, eds. (1979).  Gukanshō: The Future and the Past. Berkeley: University of California Press. ; 
 Kitagawa, Hiroshi and Bruce T. Tsuchida. (1975). The Tale of the Heike. Tokyo: University of Tokyo Press. 
 Moscher, Gouverneur. (1978). Kyoto: A Contemplative Guide. ; 
 Ponsonby-Fane, Richard Arthur Brabazon. (1959).  The Imperial House of Japan. Kyoto: Ponsonby Memorial Society. 
 Titsingh, Isaac. (1834). Nihon Odai Ichiran; ou,  Annales des empereurs du Japon.  Paris: Royal Asiatic Society, Oriental Translation Fund of Great Britain and Ireland. 
 Varley, H. Paul. (1980).  Jinnō Shōtōki: A Chronicle of Gods and Sovereigns. New York: Columbia University Press. ;

See also
 Emperor of Japan
 List of Emperors of Japan
 Imperial cult
 Emperor Go-Uda
 Kanpyō Gyoki

 
 

Japanese emperors
866 births
931 deaths
9th-century rulers in Asia
9th-century Japanese monarchs
10th-century Japanese people
Shingon Buddhist monks
Heian period Buddhist clergy
Japanese diarists
Japanese Buddhist monarchs
Japanese retired emperors
People from Kyoto